Pichincha may refer to:

Argentina
 Pichincha, Buenos Aires underground
 Pichincha, a barrio in the city of Rosario, province of Santa Fe

Ecuador
 Pichincha Volcano, a stratovolcano northern part of the country
 Pichincha Province, in northern Sierra region around the volcano
 Pichincha Canton in Manabí Province
Pichincha, the capital of Pichincha Canton

See also
 Battle of Pichincha, 1822, in modern Ecuador